Klondike is an unincorporated community in Crawford County, Kansas, United States.

History
A coal mining camp called Klondike had its start in Crawford County during the 19th century.

References

Further reading

External links
 Crawford County maps: Current, Historic, KDOT

Unincorporated communities in Crawford County, Kansas
Unincorporated communities in Kansas